Charalampos "Babis" Xanthopoulos (born 29 August 1956) is a former Greek footballer.

Club career
He spent most of his career with Iraklis being third in league appearances for the club with 283. Xanthopoulos was in the starting line-up of Iraklis in the 1976 Cup final, that earned him and the club the only nationwide title to date. He finished his career with Pierikos appearing in 52 matches for the club and scoring 7 goals.

International career
He earned 27 caps for the Greece national football team, and participated in UEFA Euro 1980. He made his debut in an away win against Australia on 11 June 1978.

Achievements
Iraklis
Greek Cup (1): 1976

References

External links

1956 births
Living people
Greek footballers
Greece international footballers
UEFA Euro 1980 players
Iraklis Thessaloniki F.C. players
Pierikos F.C. players
Super League Greece players
Association football midfielders
Footballers from Thessaloniki